Robbery, ... Style (translit. Ograblenie po...) is a 1978 Soviet parody animated film by Yefim Gamburg. It is split into four parts: Robbery, American Style; Robbery, French Style; Robbery, Italian Style, and the last, though untitled, clearly refers to the USSR. Each segment is a parody of 1960-1970s crime films in the corresponding countries.

Plot
The opening frames include a parody of the Metro-Goldwyn-Mayer logo, with Cheburashka replacing the MGM lion.

The American part parodies Hollywood action films with exaggerated explosions, car chases, striptease, violent deaths and a cold-blooded corrupt sheriff character based on Marlon Brando. The French segment parodies film noir, mostly Action Man and Any Number Can Win with Jean Gabin. The Italian episode parodies colorful Italian films, in particular Yesterday, Today and Tomorrow and Divorce Italian Style with Marcello Mastroianni, as well as Treasure of San Gennaro.

In the final 2-minute Soviet part two robbers (drawn after Saveli Kramarov and Stanislav Chekan) are trying to rob a savings bank, but it is always closed for cleanup or repairs. A militsioner at the end parodies Mikhail Zharov's Aniskin character. After Kramarov immigrated to the US, the segment was cut from the film and restored only in 1988.

Characters
All the main characters are caricatures of popular actors of the 1960s and 1970s:

Robbery, American Style
Sheriff – Marlon Brando
Fatal woman – Elizabeth Taylor
Archer, smothered by a kiss – Telly Savalas
Stripper – Kirk Douglas

Robbery, French Style
Old robber – Jean Gabin, Fernandel (plumber Jean Foleyne in the bank)
The chief of the prison is Paul Préboist
Young robber (husband of the mistress of the bar) – Alain Delon
The mistress of the bar is Brigitte Bardot
Sleeping bar visitor – Louis de Funès
Bank guard – Noël Roquevert

Robbery, Italian Style
Mario Brindisi – Marcello Mastroianni
Lucia, his wife – Sophia Loren
Police officer – Alberto Sordi

Robbery, Soviet Style
1st robber – Stanislav Chekan
2nd robber – Savely Kramarov
Militsioner – Mikhail Zharov

Voice cast 
Eduard Nazarov
Vsevolod Larionov
Gennady Morozov
Aleksandr Baranov

References

External links 
Ograblenie po... (1978) at Animator.ru
Ograblenie po... (new cut) (1988) at Animator.ru

Soviet animated films
1978 films
1978 animated films
1988 films
1988 animated films
Soviet detective films
Films scored by Gennady Gladkov
Films directed by Yefim Gamburg
Russian parody films
Soyuzmultfilm